WWL-FM (105.3 MHz) is a commercial radio station, licensed to Kenner, Louisiana, and serving the New Orleans metropolitan area.  It is owned by Audacy, Inc. and airs a news-talk and sports radio format, simulcast with WWL.   The station's studios and offices are located at the 400 Poydras Tower in New Orleans' downtown district.

WWL-FM has an effective radiated power (ERP) of 96,000 watts.  The transmitter site is off Paris Road in Chalmette, Louisiana.  WWL-FM broadcasts in the HD Radio hybrid format.  The HD-2 subchannel carries both CBS Sports Radio and shows on food and lifestyles.

Programming
Weekdays begin with an hour of early news, anchored by Dave Cohen.  Then four hours of news, sports, traffic and weather, "WWL's First News," is hosted by Tommy Tucker.  Newell Norman and Scoot host midday talk shows.  Afternoon drive time features a sports show with former New Orleans Saints' quarterback Bobby Hebert along with Kristian Garic.  In the evening, WWL-AM-FM carry the CBS Sports Radio Network when live sports are not on the air.  Overnight, a syndicated family financial show hosted by Dave Ramsey is heard, followed by This Morning, America's First News with Gordon Deal.

Weekends feature programs on money, health, gardening, the outdoors, home repair and religion, as well as repeats of weekday shows.  Some hours are paid brokered programming.  Local reporters anchor news updates in most daytime hours.  Nights and weekends, CBS Radio News is heard at the beginning of each hour.

WWL-AM-FM are the flagship stations of the NFL's New Orleans Saints.  On game days, the stations offer pre-game and post-game coverage from early morning to late night.  The stations also carry Louisiana State University Tigers football.

History

Early years
On September 8, 1970, the station signed on the air as WVSL-FM in Slidell, Louisiana.  It was owned by Bill Garrett Broadcasting, which also owned WBGS (1560 AM).  In 1981, the station switched formats to rhythmic contemporary as WAIL.

The station was acquired in 1974 by Phase Two Broadcasting, which changed the call sign to WLTS, and flipped to a soft adult contemporary format.  "Lite 105" spent 16 years in this format, although over time, the format would shift to a more uptempo, mainstream direction.

In 1999, the station was acquired by Entercom, its current owner.  The city of license was changed from Slidell to Kenner, where Louis Armstrong New Orleans International Airport is located. During this time, the station switched to a Hot Adult Contemporary format as WKZN "105.3 The Zone."

Switch to WWL simulcast
On August 29, 2005, the station's transmitter was severely damaged during Hurricane Katrina, knocking it off the air.  It returned to broadcasting with low power as a temporary simulcast of co-owned WWL. Other FM stations in New Orleans suspended their music formats during the storm's aftermath to rebroadcast news from local TV stations.

In early October 2005, Entercom decided to switch two of its New Orleans FM station dial positions, with WTKL and WKBU switching frequencies.  The 105.3 frequency became WTKL with a classic hits format and the "Kool" name, formerly "Kool 95.7."  However, only three weeks later, it was decided by Entercom to scrap the classic hits format and return 105.3 to the WWL simulcast. Entercom cited positive listener response to WWL being heard on FM and complaints about its removal from the FM dial.  Some listeners said they wanted WWL programming to remain on FM due to issues receiving the AM station in the New Orleans Central Business District.  The "Kool 105.3" format continued as an Internet-only webcast for a short time after it was discontinued on FM.

With 105.3 simulcasting WWL, Entercom asked the Federal Communications Commission (FCC) to switch the call letters to WWL-FM.  Sister station WLMG was the original home of the WWL-FM call sign, from 1970 to 1980, airing beautiful music at first, and then Top 40 hits.

References

External links

WL-FM
News and talk radio stations in the United States
Radio stations established in 1970
1970 establishments in Louisiana
Audacy, Inc. radio stations